Saketh Myneni and Ramkumar Ramanathan were the defending champions but lost in the final to Alexander Erler and Arjun Kadhe.

Erler and Kadhe won the title after defeating Myneni and Ramanathan 6–3, 6–7(4–7), [10–7] in the final.

Seeds

Draw

References

External links
 Main draw

Bengaluru Open II - Doubles
2022 Doubles